Het Overzicht (Dutch: the Survey) was a Dutch language literary magazine published in Antwerp, Belgium, between 1921 and 1925. Until its cessation in 1925 it was the major avant-garde magazine in the country and published a total of 24 issues.

History and profile
Het Overzicht was first published in June 1921. The magazine was subtitled as Half-Maandelijks Tijdschrift: Kunst, Letteren, Mensheid. Michel Seuphor was the founder of the magazine. Geert Pynenburg was also functional in the foundation. Its headquarters was in Antwerp.

During its early years Het Overzicht was pro-Flemish. Then it became a modernist periodical of European stature and adopted a constructivist, dadaist and avant-garde approach. It published poems in their original languages. Michel Seuphor and Jozef Peeters were the editors of Het Overzicht of which regular contributors included Geert Grub, Georges Walz, Alice Nahon, Leo Steiner, Gaston Burssens and Michel Seuphor.

The last issue of Het Overzicht was published in February 1925. All issues of the magazine are archived in the Middelheim Museum, Antwerp.

See also
 List of magazines in Belgium

References

External links

1921 establishments in Belgium
1925 disestablishments in Belgium
Avant-garde magazines
Dada
Defunct literary magazines published in Europe
Defunct magazines published in Belgium
Dutch-language magazines
Magazines established in 1921
Magazines disestablished in 1925
Magazines published in Belgium
Mass media in Antwerp
Poetry literary magazines